is a Japanese illustrator and video game artist from Hyūga, Miyazaki. Himukai has contributed as a novel illustrator and as a character design for various video games, including the Etrian Odyssey and Shin Megami Tensei series.

Works

Novel illustrator
 Gargoyle of Yoshinaga House (author: Taguchi Sennendō)
 Gargoyle Alternative (author: Taguchi Sennendō)
 Tamarase (author: Akira Mutsuzuka)
 Sekaiju no Meikyuu - Requiem for the things that are leaving (author: Akihiko Ureshino)
 Plot Director (author: Yūji Nakazato)
 Slayers series (original creator: Hajime Kanzaki, author: Hidehisa Nanbō)
 Slayers 1: Lina to Chimera no Mahō Senshi
 Slayers 2: Lina to Ayashii Madōshitachi

Video game-related
 Etrian Odyssey series (2007-present) (Atlus) — character design
 Kumatanchi (2008) (Vanillaware)
 Shin Megami Tensei: Devil Children (2011)
 Nora to Toki no Kōbō: Kiri no Mori no Majo (Atlus)
 Persona Q: Shadow of the Labyrinth (2014) (Atlus) — special guest contribution
 Fire Emblem Heroes (2017) (Nintendo) — character art (various)
 A-Train All Aboard! Tourism (2021) (Artdink) — character design

Adult video game-related
 Ishika to Honori (AZURITE)
 Shinohana (PL+US/Nexton)

Web-related
 Runrun Radio (Runrun Soft)

References

External links
Yuji Himukai's Site

1980 births
Living people
Japanese illustrators
Video game artists
People from Miyazaki Prefecture
Artists from Miyazaki Prefecture